This is an order of battle listing the Allied and Ottoman forces involved in the Gallipoli campaign during 1915.

Allied forces

Initial landings, 25 April 1915
Mediterranean Expeditionary Force
 Commander-in-Chief: Gen. Sir Ian Hamilton
 Chief of the General Staff: Maj-Gen. W. P. Braithwaite
 Deputy Adjutant-General: Br-Gen. E. M. Woodward
 Deputy Quartermaster-General: Br-Gen. S. H. Winter

29th Division
 Major-General A. G. Hunter-Weston
86th Brigade:
 2nd Battalion, Royal Fusiliers
 1st Battalion, Lancashire Fusiliers
 1st Battalion, Royal Munster Fusiliers
 1st Battalion, Royal Dublin Fusiliers
87th Brigade:
 2nd Battalion, South Wales Borderers
 1st Battalion, King's Own Scottish Borderers
 1st Battalion, Royal Inniskilling Fusiliers
 1st Battalion, Border Regiment
88th Brigade:
 4th Battalion, Worcestershire Regiment
 2nd Battalion, Hampshire Regiment
 1st Battalion, Essex Regiment
 5th Battalion, Royal Scots
  XV Brigade, Royal Horse Artillery (B, L & Y Batteries)
  XVII Brigade, Royal Field Artillery (13th, 26th & 92nd Batteries)
  CXLVII Brigade, Royal Field Artillery (10th, 97th & 368th Batteries)
  460th (Howitzer) Battery, Royal Field Artillery 
 4th Highland (Mountain) Brigade, Royal Garrison Artillery (TF) (Argyllshire Battery and Ross & Cromarty Battery)
  90th Heavy Battery, Royal Garrison Artillery
  14th Siege Battery, Royal Garrison Artillery
  1/2nd London, 1/2nd Lowland & 1/1st W. Riding Field Companies, Royal Engineers (TF)
  Divisional Cyclist Company

Royal Naval Division
 Major-General A. Paris
 1st (Naval) Brigade
 Drake Battalion
 Nelson Battalion
 Deal Battalion, Royal Marine Light Infantry
 2nd (Naval) Brigade
 Howe Battalion
 Hood Battalion
 Anson Battalion
 3rd (RM) Brigade
 Chatham Battalion, Royal Marine Light Infantry
 Portsmouth Battalion, Royal Marine Light Infantry
 Plymouth Battalion, Royal Marine Light Infantry
 Motor Maxim Squadron (Royal Naval Air Service)
 1st & 2nd Field Companies, RN Divisional Engineers
 Divisional Cyclist Company

Australian and New Zealand Army Corps
 G.O.C: Lieutenant-General Sir W. Birdwood

1st Australian Division
 Major-General W. T. Bridges
1st Australian Brigade:
1st (New South Wales) Battalion
 2nd (New South Wales) Battalion
 3rd (New South Wales) Battalion
 4th (New South Wales) Battalion
2nd Australian Brigade:
5th (Victoria) Battalion
 6th (Victoria) Battalion
 7th (Victoria) Battalion
 8th (Victoria) Battalion
3rd Australian Brigade:
9th (Queensland) Battalion
 10th (South Australia) Battalion
 11th (Western Australia) Battalion
 12th (South & Western Australia and Tasmania) Battalion
 I (New South Wales) Field Artillery Brigade (1st, 2nd & 3rd Batteries)
 II (Victoria) Field Artillery Brigade (4th, 5th & 6th Batteries)
 III (Queensland) Field Artillery Brigade (7th, 8th & 9th Batteries)
 1st, 2nd & 3rd Field Companies, Royal Australian Engineers

New Zealand and Australian Division
Major-General Sir A. Godley
 New Zealand Infantry Brigade
 Auckland Battalion
 Wellington Battalion
 Canterbury Battalion
 Otago Battalion
 4th Australian Brigade
 13th (New South Wales) Battalion
 14th (Victoria) Battalion
 15th (Queensland & Tasmania) Battalion
 16th (South & Western Australia) Battalion
 New Zealand Field Artillery Brigade
 1st Field Battery
 2nd Field Battery
 3rd Field Battery
 4th (Howitzer) Field Battery
 Field Company, New Zealand Engineers

ANZAC Corps Troops
 7th Indian Mountain Artillery Brigade (21st [Kohat] Battery and 26th [Jacob's] Battery)
 Ceylon Planters' Rifle Corps

Corps expéditionnaire d'Orient
 Commander: Général Albert d'Amade

1re Division
 Général Masnou
Brigade métropolitaine 
175e Régiment d’infanterie
Régiment de marche d'Afrique (2 Zouave battalions, 1 battalion of Légion étrangère)
Brigade coloniale
4e Régiment d’infanterie coloniale (2 Senegalese battalions, 1 colonial battalion)
6e Régiment d’infanterie coloniale (2 Senegalese battalions, 1 colonial battalion)
 6 artillery batteries (75mm)
 2 mountain artillery batteries (65mm)

August 1915
  'Mediterranean Expeditionary Force' (General Sir Ian Hamilton)
 VIII Corps (Lieutenant General Sir Francis Davies)
 29th Division (as above)
 42nd (East Lancashire) Division (TF)
 125th (Lancashire Fusiliers) Brigade
 1/5th Battalion, Lancashire Fusiliers
 1/6th Battalion, Lancashire Fusiliers
 1/7th Battalion, Lancashire Fusiliers
 1/8th Battalion, Lancashire Fusiliers
 126th (East Lancashire) Brigade
 1/4th Battalion, East Lancashire Regiment
 1/5th Battalion, East Lancashire Regiment
 1/9th Battalion, Manchester Regiment
 1/10th Battalion, Manchester Regiment
 127th (Manchester) Brigade
 1/5th Battalion, Manchester Regiment
 1/6th Battalion, Manchester Regiment
 1/7th Battalion, Manchester Regiment
 1/8th Battalion, Manchester Regiment
 1/I East Lancashire Brigade, RFA (1/4th, 1/5th & 1/6th East Lancashire Btys) – 1/4th & half 1/6th did not arrive until September
 1/III East Lancashire Brigade (The Bolton Artillery), RFA (1/18th, 1/19th, 1/20th East Lancashire Btys) – 1/19th & 1/20th did not arrive  until September
 1/IV East Lancashire (Howitzer) Brigade (The Cumberland Artillery), RFA (1/1st, 1/2nd Cumberland (H) Btys)
 1/1st & 1/2nd East Lancashire, 1/2nd West Lancashire Field Companies, RE
 52nd (Lowland) Division (TF)
 155th (South Scottish) Brigade
 1/4th Battalion, Royal Scots Fusiliers
 1/5th Battalion, Royal Scots Fusiliers
 1/4th Battalion, King's Own Scottish Borderers
 1/5th Battalion, King's Own Scottish Borderers
 156th (Scottish Rifles) Brigade
 1/4th Battalion, Royal Scots
 1/7th Battalion, Royal Scots
 1/7th Battalion, Cameronians (Scottish Rifles)
 1/8th Battalion, Cameronians (Scottish Rifles)
 157th (Highland Light Infantry) Brigade
 1/5th Battalion, Highland Light Infantry
 1/6th Battalion, Highland Light Infantry
 1/7th (Blythswood) Battalion, Highland Light Infantry
 1/5th Battalion, Argyll and Sutherland Highlanders
 1/IV Lowland (Howitzer) Brigade, RFA (1/4th, 1/5th City of Glasgow (H) Btys) – detached from division
 2/1st & 2/2nd Lowland Field Companies, RE
 Divisional Cyclist Company 
 Royal Naval Division (as above)

 IX Corps (Lieutenant General Frederick Stopford)
 10th (Irish) Division
 29th Brigade
 6th Battalion, Royal Irish Rifles
 5th Battalion, Connaught Rangers
 6th Battalion, Prince of Wales's Leinster Regiment (Royal Canadians)
 10th Battalion, Hampshire Regiment
 30th Brigade
 6th Battalion, Royal Munster Fusiliers
 7th Battalion, Royal Munster Fusiliers
 6th Battalion, Royal Dublin Fusiliers
 7th Battalion, Royal Dublin Fusiliers
 31st Brigade
 5th Battalion, Royal Inniskilling Fusiliers
 6th Battalion, Royal Inniskilling Fusiliers
 5th Battalion, Princess Victoria's (Royal Irish Fusiliers)
 6th Battalion, Princess Victoria's (Royal Irish Fusiliers)
 Pioneers
 5th Battalion, Royal Irish Regiment
 LV Brigade, RFA (A, B, C & D Btys) – A & C did not arrive until September
 LVI Brigade, RFA (A, B, C & D Btys) – A & B did not arrive until October
 LVII (Howitzer) Brigade, RFA (A & D Btys)
 65th, 66th & 85th Field Companies, RE
 Divisional Cyclist Company 
 11th (Northern) Division
 32nd Brigade
 9th Battalion, Prince of Wales's Own (West Yorkshire Regiment)
 6th Battalion, Alexandra, Princess of Wales Own (Yorkshire Regiment) (Green Howards)
 8th Battalion, Duke of Wellington's (West Riding Regiment)
 6th Battalion, York and Lancaster Regiment
 33rd Brigade
 6th Battalion, Lincolnshire Regiment
 6th Battalion, Border Regiment
 7th Battalion, South Staffordshire Regiment
 9th Battalion, Sherwood Foresters (Nottingham and Derbyshire Regiment)
 34th Brigade
 8th Battalion, Northumberland Fusiliers
 9th Battalion, Lancashire Fusiliers
 11th Battalion, Manchester Regiment
 5th Battalion, Dorsetshire Regiment
 Pioneers
 6th Battalion, East Yorkshire Regiment
 LVIII Brigade, RFA (A, B, C & D Btys)
 LIX Brigade, RFA (A, B, C & D Btys)
 67th, 68th & 86th Field Companies, RE
 Divisional Cyclist Company
 2nd South Western Mounted Brigade – attached
 1/1st Royal 1st Devon Yeomanry
 1/1st Royal North Devon Yeomanry
 1/1st West Somerset Yeomanry
 1/2nd South-Western Signal Troop, RE
 1/2nd South-Western Field Ambulance, Royal Army Medical Corps (RAMC)
 13th (Western) Division
 38th Brigade
 6th Battalion, King's Own (Royal Lancaster Regiment)
 6th Battalion, East Lancashire Regiment
 6th Battalion, Prince of Wales's Volunteers (South Lancashire Regiment)
 6th Battalion, Loyal North Lancashire Regiment
 39th Brigade
 9th Battalion, Royal Warwickshire Regiment
 7th Battalion, Gloucestershire Regiment
 9th Battalion, Worcestershire Regiment
 7th Battalion, Prince of Wales's (North Staffordshire Regiment)
 40th Brigade
 8th Battalion, Cheshire Regiment
 8th Battalion, Royal Welsh Fusiliers
 4th Battalion, South Wales Borderers
 5th Battalion, Duke of Edinburgh's (Wiltshire Regiment)
 Pioneers
 8th Battalion, Welch Regiment
 LXVI Brigade, RFA (A, B, C & D Btys)
 LXIX (Howitzer) Brigade, RFA (A, B, C & D Btys)
 71st, 72nd & 88th Field Companies, RE
 Divisional Cyclist Company
 Corps Troops
 1/IV Highland (Mountain) Brigade, RGA (Argyllshire, and Ross & Cromarty Btys)

 Attached to IX Corps:
 53rd (Welsh) Division (TF)
 158th (North Wales) Brigade
 1/5th (Flintshire) Battalion, Royal Welch Fusiliers
 1/6th (Caernarvonshire and Anglesey) Battalion, Royal Welch Fusiliers
 1/7th (Merionethshire and Montgomeryshire) Battalion, Royal Welch Fusiliers
 1/1st Battalion, Herefordshire Regiment
 159th (Cheshire) Brigade
 1/4th Battalion, Cheshire Regiment
 1/7th Battalion, Cheshire Regiment
 1/4th Battalion, Welch Regiment
 1/5th Battalion, Welch Regiment
 160th Brigade
 2/4th Battalion, Queen's (Royal West Surrey) Regiment
 1/4th Battalion, Royal Sussex Regiment
 2/4th Battalion Royal West Kent Regiment
 2/10th Battalion, Middlesex Regiment
 1/1st Welsh & 2/1st Cheshire Field Companies, RE
 Divisional Cyclist Company
 54th (East Anglian) Division (TF)
 161st (Essex) Brigade
 1/4th Battalion, Essex Regiment
 1/5th Battalion, Essex Regiment
 1/6th Battalion, Essex Regiment
 1/7th Battalion, Essex Regiment
 162nd (East Midland) Brigade
 1/5th Battalion, Bedfordshire Regiment
 1/4th Battalion, Northamptonshire Regiment 
 1/10th (County of London) Battalion (Hackney), London Regiment
 1/11th (County of London) Battalion (Finsbury Rifles), London Regiment
 163rd (Norfolk & Suffolk) Brigade
 1/4th Battalion, Norfolk Regiment
 1/5th Battalion, Norfolk Regiment
 1/5th Battalion, Suffolk Regiment
 1/8th Battalion, Hampshire Regiment
 1/2nd Welsh & 2/1st East Anglian Field Companies, RE
 Divisional Cyclist Company
 2nd Mounted Division (TF) – Dismounted
 2nd Mounted Division (TF) (Dismounted)
 1st (1st South Midland) Mounted Brigade
 1/1st Warwickshire Yeomanry
 1/1st Royal Gloucestershire Hussars
 1/1st Worcestershire Yeomanry
 2nd (2nd South Midland) Mounted Brigade
 1/1st Royal Buckinghamshire Hussars
 1/1st Dorsetshire Yeomanry
 1/1st Berkshire Yeomanry
 3rd (Nottinghamshire and Derbyshire) Mounted Brigade
 1/1st Sherwood Rangers Yeomanry
 1/1st South Nottinghamshire Hussars
 1/1st Derbyshire Yeomanry
 4th (London) Mounted Brigade
 1/1st County of London Yeomanry
 1/1st City of London Yeomanry (Rough Riders)
 1/3rd County of London Yeomanry (Sharpshooters)
 5th Mounted Brigade – attached
 1/1st Hertfordshire Yeomanry
 1/2nd County of London Yeomanry

 Australian and New Zealand Army Corps (Lieutenant General William Birdwood) 
 Australian 1st Division (as above)
 Australian 2nd Division
 New Zealand and Australian Division
 New Zealand Infantry Brigade
 4th Australian Brigade
 New Zealand Mounted Rifles Brigade
 1st Australian Light Horse Brigade
 Attached:
 29th Indian Brigade
 14th King George's Own Ferozepore Sikhs
 1st Battalion, 5th Gurkha Rifles (Frontier Force)
 1st Battalion, 6th Gurkha Rifles
 2nd Battalion, 10th Gurkha Rifles
 GHQ Troops
 20th Brigade, RGA (10th, 15th & 91st Heavy Btys)
 Armoured Car Division, Royal Naval Air Service (9, 10 & 11 Squadrons)
 One aviation wing: No. 3 Wing, Royal Naval Air Service (at Imbros)

  Oriental Expeditionary Corps (General Maurice Bailloud)
 1st Division (as above)
 2nd Division
3e Brigade métropolitaine 
176e Régiment d’infanterie
2eRégiment de marche d'Afrique (3 Zouave battalions)
4e Brigade coloniale
7e Régiment d’infanterie coloniale 
8e Régiment d’infanterie coloniale
 9 Batteries (75mm)
 Corps Troops
 1 Heavy Bty (120mm long)
 1 Heavy Bty (155mm long)
 2 Heavy Btys (155mm short)
 2 Siege guns (240mm)
 Battery of naval guns
One aviation squadron: Escadrille MF98T (based at Tenedos)

Naval forces

 British:

 (Sunk)

 (Sunk)

 (Sunk)

 (Sunk)

HMS Zealandia

 (Sunk)
 (Wrecked)
 (Scuttled)

 (Sunk)
 - improvised landing craft

 French:
Bouvet (Sunk)
Charlemagne
Gaulois
Henri IV
Jules Ferry
Massena (Sunk)
Saint Louis
Suffren
Jeanne d'Arc
Jurien de la Gravière
Kleber
Foudre

 (Sunk)
 (Sunk)
 Russian: 
 Askold

Ottoman forces

Initial landing, 25 April 1915

  Fifth Army (Otto Liman von Sanders)
 III Corps (Mehmet Esat Bülkat)
 7th Division
 9th Division
 19th Division (Mustafa Kemal Atatürk)
 XV Corps (Hans Kannengiesser)
 3rd Division
 11th Division
 Dardanelles Fortified Area Command
 One aircraft squadron

Note: When the campaign commenced, the Fifth Army comprised two army Corps:

 the III Corps was defending the Gallipoli peninsula 
 and the XV Corps was defending the Asian shore. 

In addition, the 5th Division was positioned north of the peninsula under the command of First Army.

August 1915
  Fifth Army (Otto Liman von Sanders)
 I Corps
 2nd Division
 3rd Division
 II Corps
 4th Division
 5th Division
 6th Division
 III Corps
 7th Division
 8th Division
 9th Division
 19th Division
 IV Corps
 10th Division
 11th Division
 12th Division
 V Corps
 13th Division
 14th Division
 15th Division
 Dardanelles Fortified Area Command
 One aircraft squadron

Naval forces

Transport (sunk 27 April 1915)

See also
List of Allied warships that served at Gallipoli

Notes

References

Bibliography

 Brig C.F. Aspinall-Oglander, History of the Great War: Military Operations Gallipoli, Vol II, May 1915 to the Evacuation, London: Heinemann, 1932/Imperial War Museum & Battery Press, 1992, ISBN 0-89839-175-X/Uckfield: Naval & Military Press, 2011, ISBN 978-1-84574-948-4.
 
 
 
 
 

World War I orders of battle
Gallipoli campaign